Angel Cosme Jr. (born August 23, 1990), better known by his stage name Monty (also known as Remy Boy Monty), is an American rapper who is best known for his work with Fetty Wap, with whom he founded the hip-hop group Remy Boyz. Buckz appears on the Fetty Wap songs "679" and "My Way", which both peaked at number 4 and 7 on the Billboard Hot 100, respectively.

Early life 
Buckz was born on August 23, 1990, in New Jersey.

Career 
Buckz gained popularity after his features on the Fetty Wap tracks "679" and "My Way", both of which peaked in the top 10 of the Billboard Hot 100. Buckz released his debut mixtape, Monty Zoo, on December 1, 2015.

Discography

Mixtapes

Singles

As lead artist

As featured artist

Other charted songs

References

External links 

African-American rappers
21st-century American rappers
American male rappers
1990 births
21st-century American male musicians
Living people
21st-century African-American musicians